Nagyveleg is a village in Fejér county, Hungary.

Location

History
Nagyveleg was first mentioned in a document in 1230. During the Ottoman wars the village was destroyed and in 1746 re-founded.

External links
 Nagyveleg Önkormányzati portál
 Nagyvelegi képek, hírek
 Nagyveleg a facebookon
 Nemzeti jelképek
 Street map 

Populated places in Fejér County